Youssef Abdelli (born 9 September 1998) is a professional footballer who currently plays as a forward for Étoile du Sahel. He is the son of former football Lassaad Abdelli.

Career statistics

Club

Notes

References

1998 births
Living people
French footballers
Tunisian footballers
Tunisian expatriate footballers
Association football forwards
Championnat National 2 players
Tunisian Ligue Professionnelle 1 players
Saudi First Division League players
Espérance Sportive de Tunis players
OGC Nice players
RC Lens players
US Monastir (football) players
Al-Ahli Saudi FC players
Étoile Sportive du Sahel players
Tunisian expatriate sportspeople in Saudi Arabia
Expatriate footballers in Saudi Arabia